Rodney M. "Rod" Fox (born c. 1981) is a Canadian politician who is a former elected member to the Legislative Assembly of Alberta representing the electoral district of Lacombe-Ponoka.

Fox's professional background is in insurance, finance, marketing, managing, and business relations. Before his election as an MLA, Fox was employed as the sales manager in the four western provinces for the largest Canadian owned insurance premium finance company, IFS Inc.
 
Fox has served as a director on the Lacombe Economic Development Board, and ran as a candidate in the 2007 Lacombe municipal election. He is also a past policy director and past president of the federal Wetaskiwin Conservative Association, and a former director of communications for MP Blaine Calkins in 2009 and 2011.

In the spring 2013 sitting of the Legislative Assembly of Alberta, Fox pushed the government to amend the rules governing condominiums. He also supported the federal government and Canadian Radio-television and Telecommunications Commission changing the rules for cell phone companies regarding cell phone contracts in favour of consumers.

On December 17, 2014, he was one of nine Wildrose MLAs who crossed the floor to join the Alberta Progressive Conservative Party caucus.  Fox lost the PC nomination vote to Peter Dewit in Lacombe-Ponoka.

Electoral history

References

Wildrose Party MLAs
1980s births
Living people
People from Whitecourt
Progressive Conservative Association of Alberta MLAs
21st-century Canadian politicians